TR6 may refer to:
Triumph TR6, a British sports car
Triumph TR6 Trophy, a British motorcycle
Tomb Raider: The Angel of Darkness, the sixth video game in the Tomb Raider series
Travan TR-6, the sixth generation of the Travan mass storage magnetic tape computer backup cartridge
 TR6, a postal district in the TR postcode area